The first election to Brecknockshire County Council was held in January 1889.   It was followed by the 1892 election. The county was divided into numerous single member wards with two or more councillors elected to represent some urban wards.

Overview of the result

Breconshire was the only county in Wales to be captured by the Conservatives.

Ward Results

Battle (one seat)

Brecon St David's (one seat)

Brecon St John's (one seat)

Brecon St Mary (one seat)

Brecon Struet (one seat)

Brecon Watton (one seat)

Brynmawr Central (one seat)

Brynmawr East (one seat)

Brynmawr South (one seat)

Brynmawr West (one seat)

Builth (one seat)

Cefncoed-y-Cymmer / Vaynor (one seat)

Cray (one seat)

Crickhowell (one seat)

Cwmdu (one seat)

Gelly and Duffryn or Vaynor Upper (one seat)

Hay (one seat)

Llanafan (one seat)

Llandefalle (one seat)

Llanelly, Rural Eastern (one seat)

Llanelly, Rural Western (one seat)

Llangammarch (one seat)

Llangattock (one seat)

Llangynider (one seat)

Llanspyddid (one seat)

Llanwrthwl (one seat)

Llanwrtyd (one seat)

References

1889 Welsh local elections
1889